The Kroger Company, or simply Kroger, is an American retail company that operates (either directly or through its subsidiaries) supermarkets and multi-department stores throughout the United States.

Founded by Bernard Kroger in 1883 in Cincinnati, Ohio, Kroger operates 2,720 grocery retail stores under its various banners and divisions in 35 states and the District of Columbia with store formats that include 134 multi-department stores, 2,277 combo stores, 188 marketplace stores, and 121 price-impact warehouse stores. Kroger operates 33 manufacturing plants, 1,629 supermarket fuel centers, 2,252 pharmacies, 225 The Little Clinic in-store medical clinics, and 129 jewelry stores (782 convenience stores were sold to EG Group in 2018). , Kroger's headquarters are located in downtown Cincinnati.

The Kroger Company is the United States' largest supermarket operator by revenue and fifth-largest general retailer. The company is one of the largest American-owned private employers in the United States. Kroger is ranked #17 on the Fortune 500 rankings of the largest United States corporations by total revenue.

About two-thirds of Kroger's employees are represented by collective bargaining agreements, with most being represented by the United Food and Commercial Workers (UFCW).

History

Beginning
In 1883, 23-year-old Bernard Kroger, the fifth of ten children of German immigrants, invested his life savings of $372 to open a grocery store at 66 Pearl Street in downtown Cincinnati. The son of a merchant, he ran his business with a simple motto: "Be particular. Never sell anything you would not want yourself." He experimented with marketing products his company had produced, so his customers would not need to patronize separate stores and farms.

In 1884, Kroger opened his second store. By 1902, the Kroger Grocery and Baking Company had been incorporated. By this time, the company had grown to forty stores and sold $1.75 million worth of merchandise each year. In addition, Kroger became the first grocery chain to have its own bakery.

In 1916, Kroger company began self-service shopping. Before this, all articles were kept behind counters. Customers would ask for them, then clerks would deliver them to customers.

In 1929, it was rumored that Safeway would merge with Kroger.

In the 1930s, Kroger became the first grocery chain to monitor product quality and to test foods offered to customers, and also the first to have a store surrounded on all four sides by parking lots.

1950s

Beginning in 1955, Kroger began acquiring supermarket chains, expanding into new markets. In May, Kroger entered the Houston, Texas, market by acquiring the Houston-based 26-store chain Henke & Pillot. In June, Kroger acquired the Krambo Food Stores, Inc. of Appleton, Wisconsin. In late July, it purchased Child's Food Stores, Inc. of Jacksonville, Texas.

In January 1956, the company bought out Big Chain Stores, Inc., a chain of seven stores based in Shreveport, Louisiana, later combining it with the Childs group. All of these chains adopted the Kroger banner in 1966.

During all the acquisitions, in September 1957, Kroger sold off its Wichita, Kansas, store division, then consisting of 16 stores, to J. S. Dillon and Sons Stores Company, then headed by Ray S. Dillon, son of the company founder.

1960s 
In October 1963, Kroger acquired the 56-store chain Market Basket, providing them with a foothold in the lucrative southern California market. (Prior to this time Kroger had no stores west of Kansas.)

Kroger opened stores in Florida under the SupeRx and Florida Choice banners from the 1960s until 1988, when the chain decided to exit the state and sold all of its stores; Kash n' Karry bought the largest share.

1970s
In the 1970s, Kroger became the first grocer in the United States to test an electronic scanner and the first to formalize consumer research.

Although Kroger has long operated stores in the Huntsville-Decatur area of northern Alabama (as a southern extension of its Nashville, Tennessee, region), it has not operated in the state's largest market, Birmingham, since the early 1970s, when it exited as a result of intense competition from Winn-Dixie and local chains Bruno's Supermarkets and Western Supermarkets.

Kroger built an ultra-modern dairy plant (Crossroad Farms Dairy) in Indianapolis in 1972, which was then considered the largest dairy plant in the world.

Kroger exited the Chicago market in 1970 selling its distribution warehouse in Northlake, Il. and 24 stores to the Dominick's Finer Foods grocery chain. 

Kroger exited the Minneapolis-St. Paul area in 1970, selling 16 stores to Quality Foods, who rebranded the stores to Piggly Wiggly.

Kroger exited Milwaukee in 1972, selling a few stores to Jewel. Kroger would later return in 2015 upon its acquisition of Roundy's.

Kroger entered the Charlotte market in 1977 and expanded rapidly throughout the 1980s when it bought some stores from BI-LO. However, most stores were in less desirable neighborhoods and did not fit in with Kroger's upscale image. Less than three months after BI-LO pulled out, that company decided to re-enter the Charlotte market, and in 1988, Kroger announced it was pulling out of the Charlotte market and put its stores up for sale. Ahold bought Kroger's remaining stores in the Charlotte area and converted them to BI-LO.

1980s
Kroger had a number of stores in the Western Pennsylvania region, encompassing Pittsburgh and surrounding areas from 1928 until 1984 when the U.S. began experiencing a severe economic recession. The recession had two significant and related effects on Kroger's operations in the region. One of them was that the highly cyclical manufacturing-based economy of the region declined in greater proportion than the rest of the U.S., which undercut demand for the higher-end products and services offered by Kroger. The second effect of the economic recession was to worsen labor-management relations, causing a protracted labor strike in 1983 and 1984. During the strike, Kroger withdrew all of its stores from the Western Pennsylvania market, including some recently opened "superstores" and "greenhouses", selling these stores to Wetterau (now part of SuperValu), who promptly flipped the stores to independent owners while continuing to supply them under the FoodLand and Shop 'n Save brands. Kroger's exit ceded the market to lower-cost, locally owned rivals, most notably Giant Eagle and the SuperValu-supplied grocers. (Kroger purchased Eagle Grocery company, whose founders went on to create Giant Eagle.) Kroger still maintains a presence in the nearby Morgantown, West Virginia, Wheeling, West Virginia, and Weirton, West Virginia/Steubenville, Ohio, areas where Giant Eagle has a much smaller presence and the SuperValu-supplied stores are virtually nonexistent, though in all of these cases, Walmart remains a major competitor and Aldi is the only other supermarket with any market overlap.

Kroger entered the competitive San Antonio, Texas, market in 1980 but pulled out in mid-1993. On June 15, 1993, the company announced the closure of its 15 area stores.

The chain closed several stores around Flint, Michigan, in 1981, which were converted by local businessman Al Kessel to a new chain called Kessel Food Markets. Kroger bought most of these stores back in 1999 and began reverting them. Several other Michigan stores were sold to another Flint-based chain, Hamady Brothers, in 1980. The Hamady acquisition was short-lived.

In 1982, Kroger sold the 65-store Market Basket chain it had operated for several years in southern California. The stores were reverted to the Boys Markets branding, after acquiring the chain. Boys Markets was acquired by the Yucaipa Companies in 1989. When Yucaipa acquired Ralphs, the Boys brand disappeared.

In 1983, The Kroger Company acquired Dillon Companies grocery chain in Kansas along with its subsidiaries (King Soopers, City Market, Fry's and Gerbes) and the convenience store chain Kwik Shop. David Dillon, a fourth-generation descendant of J. S. Dillon, the founder of Dillon Companies, became the CEO of Kroger.

In northeastern Ohio, Kroger had a plant in Solon, Ohio until the mid-1980s. When that plant shut down, Kroger closed its northeastern Ohio stores in the Cleveland, Akron, and Youngstown areas. Some of those former Kroger stores were taken over by stores like Acme Fresh Markets, Giant Eagle, and Heinens.

Kroger opened and had about 50 stores in St. Louis until it left the market in 1986, saying that its stores were unprofitable. Most of its stores were bought by National, Schnucks, and Shop 'n Save. Most of the remaining Kroger stores in eastern Missouri and west-central Illinois became a western extension of the Central Division (headquartered in Indianapolis).

Kroger also experienced a similar withdrawal from Chattanooga, Tennessee, in 1989. Many of these stores were sold to the local grocery chain Red Food, which was in turn bought by BI-LO in 1994. Today, Chattanooga is the only metropolitan market in Tennessee in which Kroger does not operate with the nearest location being Dalton, Georgia with 2 stores (Walnut Avenue and Cleveland Highway).

1990s

In the 1990s, Kroger acquired Great Scott (Detroit), Pay Less Food Markets, Owen's Market, JayC Food Stores, and Hilander Foods. Additionally, the Houston market was strengthened when Kroger bought several stores from AppleTree Markets, which were former Safeway stores in early 1994.

In 1998, Kroger merged with the then fifth-largest grocery company Fred Meyer, along with its subsidiaries, Ralphs, QFC, and Smith's.

In the late 1990s, it acquired many stores from A&P as it exited many markets in the South.

Kroger also swapped all ten of its Greensboro, North Carolina-area stores in 1999 to Matthews, North Carolina-based Harris Teeter, for 11 of that company's stores in central and western Virginia.

2000s
Long the dominant grocer in western Virginia, Kroger entered the Richmond, Virginia, market in 2000, where it competes against market leaders Martin's (including former Ukrop's stores) and Food Lion. Kroger entered the market by purchasing Hannaford stores that either already existed or were being built in Richmond. Hannaford purchases also included the competitive Hampton Roads market, where it now competes with Farm Fresh, Harris Teeter (which is owned by Kroger), and Food Lion. The Hannaford locations in these markets were purchased from Delhaize by Kroger as a condition of Delhaize's 2000 acquisition of the Hannaford chain, which had previously competed against Food Lion, also owned by Delhaize. Walmart Supercenters are also major competitors in both markets, and the chain briefly competed against Winn-Dixie, which has now exited Virginia.

In 2001, Kroger acquired Baker's Supermarkets from Fleming Companies, Inc.

Albertsons exited the San Antonio and Houston markets in early 2002, selling many of the Houston stores to Kroger.

In 2004, Kroger bought most of the old Thriftway stores in Cincinnati, Ohio, when Winn-Dixie left the area. These stores were reopened as Kroger stores.

In 2007, Kroger acquired Scott's Food & Pharmacy from SuperValu Inc., and in the same year, also
acquired 20 former Michigan Farmer Jack locations from A&P when A&P exited the Michigan Market.

In 2008, Kroger began a partnership with Murray's Cheese of New York City. Murray's Cheese counters within Kroger stores sell a variety of artisanal cheese from all parts of the world.

2010s
On July 9, 2013, Kroger announced its acquisition of (the 212 stores of Charlotte-based) Harris Teeter in a deal valued at $2.5 billion and that it will assume $100 million in the company's outstanding debt. Harris Teeter's stores are in eight Southern states, with a major portion of them in its headquarters state of North Carolina. Doing so, Kroger acquired Harris Teeter's click and collect program which allows online ordering of groceries. Some industry experts see this as a competitive move against online grocers such as AmazonFresh.  The Harris Teeter acquisition marked Kroger's return to the Charlotte market after a 25-year absence. It also allowed Kroger to enter Asheville for the first time. Charlotte and Asheville had been the only large markets in North Carolina where Kroger had no presence.

In 2013, Kroger announced that the spouses of the company's unionized workers would no longer be covered by the company's insurance plan. The company cited the Patient Protection and Affordable Care Act as a prime reason for the move. The benefit cut affects roughly 11,000 workers in Indiana. The company announced in April 2013 that full-time employees would maintain their health insurance benefits.

On March 3, 2015, Kroger announced it will enter Hawaii, having registered with the state as a new business in February 2015. The move had been in the planning stages, as it was planning to expand there in 2006 but withdrew after it had already submitted registration. Kroger, which is in the process of looking for locations to open its first store, will face competition from Honolulu-based rivals Foodland and Times; major retailers Safeway, Walmart, and Costco; Japanese-owned Don Quixote; and Department of Defense-owned DeCA Commissaries.

On May 1, 2015, Kroger announced the acquisition of the seven-store Hiller's Market chain in Southeast Michigan, and that it would operate all but one of those stores under the Kroger banner.

In June 2015, Kroger eliminated the Harris Teeter brand from the crowded Nashville, Tennessee market, where its growth had been stunted by aggressive competition since it entered with six stores in the early-2000s. Kroger has traditionally had a market-leading presence in Nashville, and initially promised to keep the five remaining Harris Teeter stores open when it acquired the chain, but later said the market "did not support Harris Teeter's future business plans." Two Harris Teeter stores were closed outright, and three closed temporarily while being converted to the Kroger brand (one of these would undergo a major remodeling and replace a neighboring Kroger store).

On November 11, 2015, Kroger and Roundy's announced a definitive merger, bringing Roundy's chain's 166 primarily Wisconsin based chains under Kroger ownership. The merger is valued at $800 million, including debt. The acquisition, which brought Kroger back to Wisconsin after a 43-year absence, will retain the Roundy's, Pick 'n Save, Mariano's, Metro Market and Copps names, along with its Milwaukee operations. (Within a year-and-a-half, however, Kroger had rebranded all Copps locations to the Pick 'n Save banner.)

In April 2016, Kroger announced that it had made a "meaningful investment" in the Boulder, Colorado-based Lucky's Market, an organic foods supermarket chain that operated 17 stores in 13 states throughout the Midwest and Southeast United States.

In February 2017, Kroger withstood large community protests after announcing the closing of two smaller-sized Louisville-area stores.
Despite high store volumes and high population densities, the Old Louisville (lease expiration) and Southland Terrace stores closed.

On February 7, 2017, it was announced that Kroger Co. had purchased Murray's Cheese.

, Kroger is no longer offering a discount to senior citizens 59 and up.

On May 1, 2017, Kroger, along with the University of Kentucky and UK Athletics, sports and campus marketing partner JMI Sports, announced a 12-year, $1.85 million per year campus marketing agreement. Included in the agreement is the naming rights to Commonwealth Stadium, the university's football stadium, which will be renamed Kroger Field. This agreement makes the University of Kentucky the first school in the Southeastern Conference to enter into a corporate partnership for the naming rights to their football stadium.

On May 10, 2017, Kroger opened its first convenience store in Blacklick, Ohio, labeled "Fresh Eats MKT". These stores have a Starbucks, and a Kroger Pharmacy. On June 1, 2017, Kroger opened their second Fresh Eats. Kroger is also going to convert some Turkey Hill stores into the concept store. The CFO, Mike Schlotman, has called these stores a "small test." Local reaction to this new concept has been positive. The concept was discontinued in March 2020.

In February 2018, Kroger announced that it will be selling its 762 convenience stores to EG Group, a British service station operator, for $2.15 billion. They operate under the Turkey Hill, Loaf 'N Jug, Kwik Shop, Tom Thumb and Quik Stop banners. Kroger will retain just over 20 convenience stores.  Kroger's supermarket fuel centers are not included in the sale. The sale was closed on April 20, 2018.

On April 10, 2018, Kroger announced plans to hire an estimated 11,000 new employees. An estimated 2,000 managerial positions will be filled by the new hires. With the addition of these new hires, the total number of people employed by the company is close to half a million.

On May 17, 2018, Kroger announced a partnership with Ocado, a UK-based online supermarket. The partnership is designed to improve Kroger's ecommerce program, including online ordering, automated fulfillment, and home delivery via the construction of 20 new, automated fulfillment centers. , five locations have been identified for the new warehouses, and two are under construction. Kroger has taken advantage of its investment in online shopping capability to grow rapidly during the pandemic. In 2020, Kroger's online sales grew by 116%, to over $10B annually.

On May 24, 2018, Kroger announced they were acquiring Home Chef for $200 million with an additional $500 million in incentives if certain targets are met by Home Chef.

On June 13, 2018, Kroger Mid-Atlantic announced the Kroger branding will be leaving the Raleigh-Durham area by eliminating all 14 Kroger-branded stores, eight of which will transition to Harris Teeter (also owned by Kroger). One will become a Crunch Fitness and another will become a Food Lion. The fate for the remaining four stores is unclear.

In July 2018, Kroger officials backed off a Net 90 payment plan to the produce industry.

In October 2018, Kroger announced online wine delivery to 14 states in partnership with DRINKS. Customers can select assorted wines in 6-bottle or 12-bottle packs.

On December 4, 2018, Kroger announced a deal to sell food inside drugstore Walgreens. Kroger Express will offer meal kits and other meal solutions.

In the light of increased self-checkout usage via kiosk or smartphone app in 2019, Kroger is gradually shifting towards creating more self-checkout smartphone apps and lanes than cashier lanes. The company has been investing millions of dollars, in replacing many cashier stations with automation by 2023. As many other supermarkets (such as Walmart, Target, etc.) are also shifting towards automation, and displacing cashiers in the near future.

In March 2019, Kroger announced it was expanding its service with robotics company, Nuro to Houston, Texas with Nuro's autonomous Priuses.

In August 2019, Kroger began charging customers between $0.50 and $3.50 for receiving cash back while making purchases with debit cards. The new fees were first test marketed in March at Kansas area Dillons stores, a Kroger-owned supermarket chain, before the new fees were rolled out to other Kroger-owned supermarket banners in the rest of the nation.

In September 2019, Kroger announced a partnership with the Plant Based Food Association (PFBA) to test a plant-based meat retail concept in 60 stores in Denver, and parts of Indiana and Illinois.

In November 2019, Kroger unveiled an updated logo for their stores and company, with the '"Fresh For Everyone" tagline and the "Krojis". The company also announced an expansion of its online wine delivery program into Arizona. In partnership with DRINKS, the service is now available in 19 states plus Washington D.C.

In December 2019, Kroger was named the second-largest grocer in the nation with $110 billion in 2016 sales. The same month, USA Today listed Kroger—and its brands—as the top supermarket (based on Google searches, Yelp data and 24/7 Tempo's research) in Alaska, Indiana, Kentucky, Mississippi, Ohio, Oregon, Tennessee, Virginia, Washington, and West Virginia.

2020s

According to a PBS NewsHour February 13, 2021 broadcast, during the pandemic, Kroger provided their essential workers a "hazard pay"—that the company called a "hero pay"—in the form of US$2 dollars an hour raise from the end of March 2020, until mid-May, 2020, when the "hero pay" ended. In January 2021, the Long Beach City Council in California, passed an ordinance making it mandatory for some large grocery stores—like Kroger—to provide their essential workers hazard pay of US$4 dollars an hour "effective immediately for 120 days." The ordinance affected "companies with more than 300 workers nationwide and more than 15 employees per store." Seattle and Washington passed similar ordinances. In response, in early February, Kroger announced the "closure and permanent termination of the "entirety of the operations" of some of their stores [in April 2021]—which includes a Ralphs and a Food4Less in Long Beach—"for economic reasons including the economic cost mandated by the Long Beach ordinance requiring an increase in employee wages, four dollars an hour." The United Food and Commercial Workers (UFCW), with members whose jobs have been terminated, "view the closures as a warning to other cities considering hazard pay mandates." Andrea Zinder, president of the UFCW Local 324 that represents employees at the two stores—Ralphs and a Food4Less—said that compared to the same time period in 2019 both stores saw an increase of about 30% in sales. In 2020, during the pandemic, Kroger's earnings increased by 87.7%. Kroger's quarterly revenues as reported by November 20, 2020, were US$29.72 billion, and the corporation's per-share earnings and dividends grew at a rapid rate in 2020. Its dividend increase was about 14% annually.

Starting in early 2020, Berkshire Hathaway began buying shares of Kroger, and by August 2021 became a top ten shareholder.

In 2021, the company was reported to have been breached by a third-party hack which compromised the pharmacy records of Kroger owned Fred Meyer and QFC stores' customers.

On August 2, 2021, Kroger announced that it had elected Elaine Chao, formerly Secretary of Labor under President George W. Bush and Secretary of Transportation under President Donald Trump, to its board of directors. The news was met with backlash from Kroger customers on Twitter, with calls for a boycott trending nationally, due to her ties to the Trump administration and to her husband, Mitch McConnell.

On September 23, 2021, a mass shooting occurred at a Kroger location in Collierville, Tennessee. One person was killed and 13 others were injured before the gunman, identified as 29-year-old Uk Thang, committed suicide by gunshot. Thang was working at the store as a third-party vendor. In the aftermath of the shooting, Kroger offered counseling services for its employees and closed down the store until November 10.

In September 2021, Kroger tweaked its logo to add the "Fresh Cart" symbol. The symbol is an abstract shopping cart with the basket being citrus slices.

In October 2021, Kroger announced an expansion into South Florida with its online delivery service, 'Kroger Delivery'. To do this, Kroger will build two new automated fulfilment centres assisted and facilitated by the UK-based technology company Ocado Group. Kroger Delivery is also set to launch in the Northeast of the US and expand its operations in California, to be followed by sites in Texas, Georgia, Maryland, Wisconsin, Michigan, Arizona, and North Carolina. The company launched its online delivery services in Central Florida earlier in 2021.

On April 5, 2022, Kroger launched Kroger Restaurant Supply in the Dallas-Ft. Worth area, a new business distributing food and related supplies to restaurants, bakeries, and catering companies. For Kroger, this move into foodservice distribution represents an expansion beyond its core retail grocery operations.

On October 14, 2022, Kroger announced a merger with Albertsons in a deal worth $24.6billion, combining both companies into one entity, but divesting some stores to secure regulatory approval, with the transaction expected to close in early 2024.

Finances 
For the fiscal year 2020, Kroger reported earnings of US$1.907 billion, with an annual revenue of US$122.286 billion, an increase of 0.4% over the previous fiscal cycle. Kroger's shares traded at over $32 per share, and its market capitalization was valued at US$25.9 billion in April 2020.

Carbon footprint
Kroger reported Total CO2e emissions (Direct + Indirect) for the twelve months ending 31 December 2020 at 5,090 Kt (−659 /−11.5% y-o-y). Reported emissions have been declining since 2016.

Chains

Number of locations by banner
Baker's: 11 locations (NE)
City Market: 34 locations (CO, UT and WY)
Dillons: 63 locations (KS)
Food 4 Less: 101 locations (CA, IL and IN)
Foods Co.: 20 locations (CA)
Fred Meyer: 132 locations (AK, ID, OR and WA)
Fry's: 126 locations (AZ)
Gerbes: 6 locations (MO)
Harris Teeter: 258 locations (DE, DC, FL, GA, MD, NC, SC and VA)
JayC: 22 locations (IN)
King Soopers: 118 locations (CO and WY)
Kroger: 1,238 locations (AL, AR, GA, IL, IN, KY, LA, MI, MS, MO, OH, SC, TN, TX, VA and WV)
Mariano's: 44 locations (IL)
Metro Market: 21 locations (WI)
Pay Less: 9 locations (IN)
Pick 'n Save: 84 locations (WI)
QFC: 59 locations (OR and WA)
Ralphs: 185 locations (CA and KY)
Ruler Foods: 48 locations (IL, IN, KY, MO, OH and TN)
Smith's: 141 locations (AZ, ID, MT, NV, NM, UT and WY)

Kroger Marketplace
Kroger Marketplace is a chain of big-box stores. The brand was introduced in 2004 in the Columbus, Ohio, area, which lost the Big Bear and Big Bear Plus chains in Penn Traffic's Chapter 11 bankruptcy. The Kroger Marketplace format is based on the Fry's Marketplace stores that the Arizona division of Kroger is currently operating. There are currently a total of 188 marketplaces.

Similar to rival chains Meijer, Sears, Kmart, Target, Walmart, and Albertsons, and modeled after Kroger-owned Fred Meyer, these stores contain multiple departments. In addition to the grocery department, they usually contain a Fred Meyer Jewelers, Starbucks, Donatos Pizza, and an in-store bank, as well as sections for toys, appliances, home furnishings and bed and bath, something that Big Bear once had in their stores in the Columbus area.

In 2005, the company began renovating many Kroger Food & Drug stores in Ohio for an expanded and remodeled look, converting them to the Kroger Marketplace format. In February 2006, Kroger announced plans for two new Kroger Marketplace stores to open by the end of the summer in Cincinnati suburbs Lebanon and Liberty Township. The store in Liberty Township opened in July 2006. On October 5, 2006, a new Kroger Marketplace opened in Gahanna. With the Gahanna opening, the number of Kroger Marketplace stores is six, four in the Columbus area and two in the Cincinnati area. Two more stores were planned in 2007, one in Middletown (which opened in April 2007, after the old store was razed and made part of the current parking lot) and one in Englewood.

In 2011, the Elder-Beerman in Centerville, Ohio was demolished, and a new marketplace has been built in its place. It has a fuel center and opened on December 8.

Two more stores opened in the Cincinnati area, in the Northern Kentucky suburbs of Hebron and Walton which were completed in November 2008. Three Kroger Marketplace stores in Kentucky opened in 2009, two in Lexington and one in Newport. Another Marketplace opened in Beavercreek, Ohio. A Mount Orab, Ohio, store opened in the spring of 2010. Kroger opened a new  store in North Augusta, South Carolina. In 2015, a  Marketplace was opened in the Cincinnati suburb of Oakley.

The first Kroger Marketplace store in Texas opened on October 9, 2009, in the Waterside Marketplace in Richmond, Texas. The second Kroger Marketplace store in Rosenberg, Texas, opened on December 4, 2009. The third opened in Frisco, Texas, in early 2010. The fourth, in Willis, Texas, opened on August 11, 2011. Other Kroger Marketplace stores in Texas are in Little Elm, Texas; Fort Worth's Alliance Town Center; Mansfield; Wylie, Texas; and Baytown, Texas.

A third location opened in Gallatin, Tennessee, on March 11, 2010.

The first Kroger Marketplace in Arkansas opened in August 2010 on Chenal Parkway in Little Rock, Arkansas. Locations also opened in 2012 in Conway, Arkansas and 2014 in Jonesboro, Arkansas.

The first Kroger Marketplace in Virginia opened on Midlothian Turnpike in Richmond, Virginia, on the site of the former Cloverleaf Mall on December 6, 2012. Another Marketplace opened in Virginia Beach, Virginia, at the site of a former Super Kmart, on July 31, 2013.  The third location opened in December 2013 in the Staples Mill shopping Center in Henrico County.  A fourth location opened on October 15, 2014, in Portsmouth, Virginia, at the site of the former I.C. Norcom High School.

The first Kroger Marketplace in Mississippi opened on September 16, 2016, in Hernando (a suburb of Memphis, Tennessee) to much fanfare. This store was formally a Kroger Food & Drug with twelve aisles, now rebuilt with sixty-four, in addition to having a Starbucks, ClickList, and expanded deli inside.

The first Kroger Marketplace in Indiana opened on September 29, 2011, on Dupont Road on Fort Wayne's northwest side. This store is a rebuilt Kroger Food & Drug. A second Kroger Marketplace opened on October 4, 2012, from a rebuilt Scott's Food and Pharmacy in the Village at Coventry on the southwest side of Fort Wayne. These two stores are part of a $100 million expansion project in the Fort Wayne area. In October 2016, it was announced that a Kroger Marketplace will open in La Porte, Indiana within the NewPorte Landing development. Construction of the new  store is expected to begin early in 2018.

The first Kroger Marketplace in Michigan opened on June 14, 2013, at Sterns and Secor Roads in Lambertville (a small-sized suburb north of Toledo, Ohio). It carries toys, home essentials, apparel and shoes in addition to groceries. The state's second store opened in 2014 in Shelby Township on property that already contained a 2010-built Fuel Center, replacing a smaller Kroger store across Hayes Road in neighboring Macomb Township, which was soon converted into an Emagine Entertainment movie theater. Three further locations opened in 2016, one in White Lake on the site of what was once one of Kmart's "green" prototype stores and directly adjacent to the smaller Kroger store that this location replaced, a second Shelby Township location at 26 Mile Road and Van Dyke Avenue, and one at 12 Mile Road and Stephenson Highway in Royal Oak. A sixth location opened on Fort Street in Southgate on September 20, 2017. This store, which is a former Super Kmart, is the largest Kroger location in Michigan, with seventy aisles along with a small cafe section and dedicated ClickList parking spaces.

Manufacturing and distribution

Distribution and logistics
Food distribution and buying takes place under various subsidiaries and divisions. These include:
 Kroger Group Cooperative, Inc.
 Kroger Group, Inc.
 Peytons
 WESCO
 Inter-American Products

Kroger operates its own fleet of trucks and trailers to distribute products to its various stores, in addition to contracts with various trucking companies. In June 2018, Kroger announced testing driverless cars for delivering groceries. For this, Kroger is partnering with autonomous car company Nuro.

In addition to stocking a variety of regional brand products, The Kroger Company also employs one of the largest networks of private label manufacturing in the country. Thirty-three plants (either wholly owned or used with operating agreements) in seventeen states create about 40% of Kroger's private label products. Similar to most major supermarket retailers, Kroger uses a three-tiered private label marketing strategy. One private brand emphasizes no-frills products at the lowest possible price, another is intended to be comparable to leading national brands but a better value and the third is a premium (often organic) brand.

Manufacturing plants

Dairies
Kroger operates 18 dairy plants:

 Centennial Farms Dairy in Atlanta, Georgia
 Compton Creamery in Compton, California
 Crossroad Farms Dairy in Indianapolis, Indiana
 Heritage Farms Dairy in Murfreesboro, Tennessee
 Hunter Farms Dairy in High Point, North Carolina 
 Jackson Hutchinson Dairy in Hutchinson, Kansas
 Layton Dairy in Layton, Utah
 Michigan Dairy in Livonia, Michigan
 Mountain View Foods in Denver, Colorado
 Pace Dairy—Rochester in Rochester, Minnesota
 Pace Dairy—Indiana in Crawfordsville, Indiana
 Riverside Creamery in Riverside, California
 Swan Island Dairy in Portland, Oregon
 Tamarack Farms Dairy in Newark, Ohio
 Tolleson Dairy in Tolleson, Arizona
 Vandervoort's Dairy in Fort Worth, Texas
 Westover Dairy in Lynchburg, Virginia
 Winchester Farms Dairy in Winchester, Kentucky

Bakeries
Kroger operates nine plants:

 Anderson Bakery in Anderson, South Carolina
 Clackamas Bakery in Clackamas, Oregon
 Country Oven Bakery in Bowling Green, Kentucky
 Indianapolis Bakery in Indianapolis, Indiana
 K.B. Specialty Foods in Greensburg, Indiana
 King Soopers Bakery in Denver, Colorado
 La Habra Bakery in La Habra, California
 Layton Dough in Layton, Utah
 RCK Foods in Kenosha, Wisconsin

Grocery items
Kroger operates seven grocery plants:

 America's Beverage Co. in Irving, Texas: soft drinks, waters
 Delight Products in Springfield, Tennessee: dry dog and cat foods
 Kenlake Foods in Murray, Kentucky: nuts, hot cereal, cornmeal, powdered drinks
 Pontiac Foods in Pontiac, South Carolina: coffee, seasonings, spices, rice, noodles, sauces
 Springdale Ice Cream & Beverage in Springdale, Ohio: soft drinks, waters, ice cream
 State Avenue in Cincinnati, Ohio: salad dressings, red sauces, syrups, broths, jams and jellies
 Tara Foods in Albany, Georgia: peanut butter, flavorings, steak sauces, vinegar, cooking wines, lemon juice, soy sauce

Private label brands
Kroger offers a collection of its own branded products, referred to by the retailer as "Our Brands". The products are produced and sold in quality tiers, and account for over 30% of the retailer's unit sales.

Banner Brand
Banner Brand items are goods that bear the name of Kroger or its subsidiaries (i.e., Ralphs, King Soopers, etc.) or make reference to them (i.e., Big K), and are offered exclusively within Kroger-owned stores. These products are marketed to customers as budget-friendly, and account for over $13 billion in annual sales. Many of Kroger's health and beauty goods, one of the company's fastest-growing private label categories, are manufactured by third-party providers; these products include goods like ibuprofen and contact lens solution.

Private Selection

Products marked Private Selection are offered to compare with gourmet brands or regional brands that may be considered more upscale than the standard Kroger brand products.

Simple Truth
Simple Truth is Kroger's flagship natural and organic brand, and has grown quickly since its launch in 2012. The brand's launch marked the first time Kroger had delved into making its own gluten-free products, including flour mixes, bread, etc. The Simple Truth brand became the first Kroger offering to be introduced in China, on Alibaba's Tmall platform. Simple Truth reached $2 billion in annual sales in 2018.

Other private label brands
In addition to its core brands, Kroger's manufacturing creates a variety department-specific brands. These are featured especially in Fred Meyer stores, where more than half the goods sold are non-food, or in the smaller Fred Meyer-based Marketplace stores. The brands listed below may be found in various Kroger-owned stores.

 Abound – natural pet food
 Bakery Fresh Goodness – fresh-baked foods
 Bloom Haus – floral arrangements
 Comforts – baby products
 Dip – fast fashion brand designed by Joe Mimran
 Everyday Living – home goods
 HD Designs – upscale home goods
 HemisFares – imported foods
 Home Chef – meal kit and food delivery company acquired in 2018
 Luvsome – pet food
 Murray's Cheese – artisanal cheese shop founded in Greenwich Village in 1940
 OfficeWorks – stationery and office supplies
 Pet Pride – pet food

Other operations

Pharmacy Group
Kroger previously owned and operated the SupeRx drug store chain. In 1985, Kroger outbid Rite Aid for the Hook's Drug Stores chain, based in Indianapolis, Indiana, and combined it with SupeRx to become Hook's-SupeRx. In 1994, Kroger decided to exit the stand-alone drugstore business and sold its Hook's and SupeRx stores to Revco, which later was sold to CVS.

Today, Kroger operates 2,252 pharmacies, most of which are located inside its supermarkets. The Kroger Pharmacies continue as a profitable portion of the business and have been expanding to now include pharmacies in City Market, Dillons, Fred Meyer, Fry's, King Soopers, QFC, Ralphs, Harris Teeter, Smith's Food and Drug, and Kroger Supermarkets.

Supermarket Petroleum Group
Since 1998, Kroger has added fuel centers in the parking lots of its supermarkets. More recently, the company has begun opening standalone fuel centers, often near stores whose parking lots could not accommodate a fuel center. As of Q2 2022, Kroger operated 1,629 supermarket fuel centers.

In 2006, Kroger introduced a new common logo for all of its convenience store chains that is now also used at the fuel centers of all of its supermarket chains—a rhombus with a white, stylized image of the continental United States in the center bordered by four colored areas: dark blue representing the Pacific Ocean, red representing Canada, green representing the Atlantic Ocean, and yellow representing the Gulf of Mexico.

Kroger Personal Finance
Kroger Personal Finance was introduced in 2007 to offer branded Visa cards, mortgages, home equity loans, pet, renter's and home insurance, identity theft protection, and wireless services. In 2017, MasterCard became the network for Kroger's newly branded 1-2-3 REWARDS credit card issued by U.S. Bank. In 2019, Kroger banned the use of Visa credit cards (but not debit cards) at two of its subsidiary chains: Foods Co. Supermarkets and Smiths, citing rising costs from premium cards.

Kroger Wireless 
Kroger Wireless, formerly known as i-wireless, is a national private label wireless service provider sold in over 2,200 retail locations within the Kroger family of stores across 31 states.  Kroger Wireless service functions over the nationwide Sprint network. Customers can choose from "Unlimited" rate plans including unlimited talk/text and with data allotments up to and including unlimited data. Kroger Wireless allows customers to purchase phones at select Kroger store locations, via their website, or by bringing their eligible Sprint device for activation.

84.51° 
84.51° is a wholly owned subsidiary of Kroger engaged in data science and consumer insights, created in April 2015, as a result of Kroger purchasing the remaining half of its then-joint venture Dunnhumby USA from Tesco.

Controversies

In 2008, Greenpeace started ranking America's major supermarket chains on their seafood sustainability practices because, according to Greenpeace U.S. CEO Phil Radford, "three quarters of global fish stocks are suffering from overfishing, and 90% of top marine predators are already gone." Criteria included the number of threatened fish species supermarkets sold, their seafood purchasing policies, and ocean legislation policies they supported. In 2013, Kroger was noted for carrying 17 out of 22  Red
 List species, four of which are in the top list of said species.

In 2014, Moms Demand Action for Gun Sense in America, a national gun control organization backed by former New York Mayor Michael Bloomberg, began a campaign to pressure the Kroger chain to ban the open carry of firearms in all of its stores. The group decided to take action in response to demonstrations by open carry activists in Kroger stores in Ohio and Texas after conducting research that identified more than a dozen shootings on Kroger property since 2012. Kroger rebuffed their demand, stating, "If the local gun laws are to allow open carry, we'll certainly allow customers to do that based on what the local laws are. We don't believe it's up to us to legislate what the local gun control laws should be. It's up to the local legislators to decide to do that. So we follow local laws, we ask our customers to be respectful to the other people they are shopping with. And we really haven't had any issues inside of our stores as a result of that."

Kroger was criticized in 2021 when, rather than pay a temporary bonus to workers during the pandemic mandated by the city of Long Beach, California, it closed its stores in that community instead.

In July 2021, a wrongful-death lawsuit was filed against Kroger by the family of worker Evan Seyfried. Seyfried committed suicide after allegedly enduring abuse at the Kroger location in Milford, Ohio, where he had worked for 19 years. According to the lawsuit, Seyfried was bullied for wearing a mask in the early days of the pandemic and taunted for his political views. Also on the receiving end of alleged workplace sabotage, one of Seyfried's co-workers called the company's ethics helpline and reported she and Seyfried were being bullied. However, no action was taken.

In December 2021, Kroger Co. announced elimination of some COVID-19 benefits for unvaccinated employees. The company told employees that it will no longer provide two weeks of paid emergency leave for unvaccinated employees who contract COVID-19, unless local jurisdictions require otherwise. Kroger will also add a $50 monthly surcharge to company health plans for unvaccinated managers and other nonunion employees.

A 2022 Economic Roundtable survey of 10,000 workers in Colorado, Southern California, Washington found that workers' wages have declined over the last several years while over the same period executive pay has increased. The survey found that over 75% of workers experience food insecurity, over 66% struggle to meet basic needs and 14% experience homelessness, while CEO Rodney McMullen made over $22 million in 2020, compared to $12 million for the year 2018. According to Peter Dreier, who participated in the project: "There are workers sleeping in RVs or couch surfing or living in parks somewhere. Americans go to their local supermarket every week and smile at the person cashing them out, not aware that the person they're talking to is going to sleep in a car after they clock out." About two-thirds of Kroger employees are part-time workers, whose schedules often change making it difficult to take a second job.

References

Further reading

Videos

External links
 
 Corporate website
 Website for Kroger-branded stores

 
1883 establishments in Ohio
American companies established in 1883
Companies based in Cincinnati
Companies listed on the New York Stock Exchange
Retail companies established in 1883
Supermarkets of the United States